Aimi may refer to:

 Aimi, Tottori, a former town in Saihaku District, Tottori Prefecture, Japan
 Aimi Station, a railway station in Kōta, Aichi Prefecture, Japan

People with the surname
 Aldo Aimi (1906–1980), Italian footballer
 Mohammad Nader Aimi (born 1982), Afghan footballer

People with the given name
, Japanese voice actress and singer
, Japanese handball player
, Japanese volleyball player
, Japanese pianist
, Japanese women's footballer
Aimi MacDonald (born 1942), Scottish actress
, Japanese voice actress
, Japanese gravure idol, actress, AV idol

Fictional characters
, fictional Japanese idol member of AKB48
/, anti-heroine of SHADOW LADY

See also
 Aimee
 Aimie
 Ami (disambiguation)
 Amy
 Eimi (disambiguation)

Japanese feminine given names